Greek Autonomous District was a national district created according to the policy national delimitation in the Soviet Union. It was established on February 27, 1930 by the decree of the Azov-Black Sea Krai ispolkom, with the capital in stanitsa Krymskaya (now the town of Krymsk). In 1932 the capital was moved to stanitsa  Nizhne-Bakanskaya. It was the only one district of republican subordination (i.e., subordinated directly to a Soviet republic, rather than to an intermediate-level administrative entity). This Greek autonomy in the Soviet Union existed until March 6, 1939, when it was disbanded and the administrative entity renamed to Krymsky District by the decree of Krasnodar Krai kraikom of the All-Russian Communist Party, by the end of the first wave of the Soviet repression against ethnic Greeks.

References

Subdivisions of the Russian Soviet Federative Socialist Republic
History of Krasnodar Krai
Soviet ethnic policy
Former administrative units of Russia
Persecution of Greeks in the Soviet Union
Greek diaspora in Russia
Autonomous administrative divisions
1930 establishments in the Soviet Union
1939 disestablishments in the Soviet Union